Dequan Finn (born April 21, 2001) is an American football quarterback for the Toledo Rockets.

High school career 
Finn attended Martin Luther King High School in Detroit, Michigan. As a senior, Finn threw for 25 touchdowns and 2,104 yards while also having 21 rushing touchdowns and 1,264 yards rushing. He would lead Martin Luther King to a state championship, while being named the 2018 Mr. Football Michigan. A three-star recruit, Finn was originally committed to Central Michigan but he would flip to Toledo after Central Michigan fired head coach John Banamego.

College career 
Finn played sparingly in his first two years with Toledo, as he red-shirted in his freshman season. In 2021, Finn's production increased as he threw for 18 touchdowns and just two interceptions while rushing for nine touchdowns. Entering the 2022 season, Finn was named to the preseason Maxwell Award watch list. On October 15, 2022, he tied a school record, throwing six touchdowns in a 52–31 comeback win against Kent State and set the school record for most touchdowns in a game (7) by adding one rushing score. In 2022, Finn led the Rockets to their first MAC West championship since the 2017 season. In the 2022 MAC Championship Game Finn was named the offensive MVP. Finn also won the offensive MVP in the 2022 Boca Raton Bowl

Statistics

Personal life 
On August 18, 2022, Finn signed an NIL deal with the Detroit Sports Commission, becoming an ambassador for the 17th Xenith Prep Kickoff Classic.

References

External links 
 Toledo Rockets bio

Living people
Toledo Rockets football players
2001 births
American football quarterbacks
People from Detroit
Sportspeople from Detroit
Martin Luther King High School (Detroit) alumni
African-American players of American football
Players of American football from Michigan